Katvari Manor is a manor house in , Katvari Parish, Limbaži Municipality, in the historical region of Vidzeme, in northern Latvia.

History 
Originally built in the middle of the 18th century, red brick outer walls were added during the 19th century. From 1920 to 2008 the building housed the Katvari primary school.

See also
List of palaces and manor houses in Latvia

References

External links
  Katvari Manor

Manor houses in Latvia